is a retired relief pitcher in Major League Baseball, best-selling author and Japanese television personality. He achieved the most recognition when he played for the Seattle Mariners from  through . Previously, Hasegawa played with the Anaheim Angels (–), and before that spent six years with the Orix BlueWave. He bats and throws right-handed.

Baseball career
He was a teammate of Ichiro Suzuki in Japan, and won two championships with the Orix BlueWave. In six seasons with the BlueWave, he was 57-45 with a 3.33	ERA.

Hasegawa was purchased by the Anaheim Angels in January 1997, and he pitched well as a setup man. He signed with the Seattle Mariners on January 14, 2002. In , Hasegawa was named to the American League All-Star team as a middle reliever. He converted 16 of 17 saves at the end of the season when Mariners closer Kazuhiro Sasaki was injured. He concluded the season with a 1.48 ERA in 63 relief appearances.

Hasegawa was not offered a contract by the Mariners after the 2005 season, On January 23, 2006, he announced his retirement despite receiving several offers from Major League and Japanese league teams. In his nine-season MLB career, Hasegawa compiled a 45–44 record with 33 saves and a 3.71 ERA in 517 games. He holds the record for most appearances by an Asian pitcher in Major League Baseball ahead of Hideo Nomo. Hasegawa was known for releasing the ball very quickly, throwing off the batter's timing. He was very durable, spending time on the disabled list only once in nine years in the majors.

Personal life
Hasegawa explained that he did not move to the U.S. to play in the majors; he entered the majors because he wanted to live in the U.S. He has since obtained permanent residence in the U.S. He speaks fluent English, even interviewing teammates on an American television show, and he introduced himself in English at his first press conference in the U.S. He has also published a book in Japan with tips on improving English language skills.

In addition to selling real estate in Irvine, California, Hasegawa frequently appears on baseball-related television shows in Japan, and is a commentator for major league games shown in Japan on NHK.

References

External links

Japanese league stats and info of Shigetoshi Hasegawa

1968 births
American League All-Stars
Anaheim Angels players
Japanese expatriate baseball players in the United States
Living people
Major League Baseball pitchers
Major League Baseball players from Japan
Nippon Professional Baseball pitchers
Nippon Professional Baseball Rookie of the Year Award winners
Orix BlueWave players
People from Kakogawa, Hyōgo
Baseball people from Hyōgo Prefecture
Seattle Mariners players
Sportspeople from Newport Beach, California
Baseball players from California